Esk National Park is a national park in South East Queensland, Australia.  It is located in Redbank Creek, in the Somerset Region of Queensland, Australia. The park was gazetted in 2006.  It aims to protect a piece of remant vegetation of significant biodiversity value.

The park lies within the Brisbane River catchment with a subtropical climate.

See also

Protected areas of Queensland

References

Protected areas established in 2006
2006 establishments in Australia
National parks of South East Queensland